Chinese Taipei School may refer to:
Chinese Taipei School Kuala Lumpur
Chinese Taipei School Penang